Some Say I So I Say Light is the second studio album by British singer Ghostpoet. It was released on 6 May 2013.

Track listing

Critical reception

Some Say I So I Say Light received generally favorable reviews from music critics.

Single
"Meltdown", with guest vocals by Woodpecker Wooliams, was released as a single in April 2013.

References

2013 albums
Albums produced by Richard Formby
Ghostpoet albums
PIAS Recordings albums